During the 1931–32 season Hibernian, a football club based in Edinburgh, finished seventh out of 20 clubs in the Scottish Second Division.

Scottish Second Division

Final League table

Scottish Cup

See also
List of Hibernian F.C. seasons

References

External links
Hibernian 1931/1932 results and fixtures, Soccerbase

Hibernian F.C. seasons
Hibernian